The Motion Picture Association – Canada, or MPA-Canada, is a film industry trade group that speaks for and represents the major U.S. producers and distributors of motion pictures, streaming media, and television programming in Canada.

It is the Canadian counterpart of the American Motion Picture Association (MPA).

Through the Motion Picture Classification Corporation of Canada (MPCCC), MPA-Canada administers the Canadian Home Video Rating System.

Functions
The organization exists to promote the interests of its member organizations, and expand the Canadian film and video industry. It lobbies at the provincial and federal government levels to advance its agenda.

MPA–Canada administers the Canadian Home Video Rating System (CHVRS), though unlike the MPA it does not rate films itself, instead depending on provincial ratings.

The organization functions as copyright advocate, and directs an anti-piracy initiative.

Member organizations
Only American companies are part of the organization; there are no Canadian members.
 Walt Disney Studios
 Sony Pictures Entertainment
 Netflix Studios
 Paramount Pictures
 Universal Pictures 
 Warner Bros. Entertainment

References

External links
 
 
 

Arts and media trade groups
Cartels
Film organizations in Canada
Entertainment rating organizations
Multinational mass media companies
Organizations established in 1922